Until 1 January 2007 Juelsminde municipality was a municipality (Danish, kommune) in Vejle County on the east coast of the Jutland peninsula in central Denmark.  The municipality included the island of Hjarnø, and covered an area of 240 km².  It had a total population of 15,555 (2005).  Its last mayor was Peter Schmidt Hansen, a member of the Venstre (Liberal Party) political party. The main town and the site of its municipal council was the town of Juelsminde.  

The main part of the municipality was located on a headland.

Juelsminde municipality was, as the result of Kommunalreformen ("The Municipality Reform" of 2007), merged with Hedensted municipality and most of Tørring-Uldum municipality to form a new Hedensted municipality.  This created a municipality with an area of 565 km² and a total population of 56,508 (2005).  The new municipality belongs to Region Midtjylland.

References  
 Municipal statistics: NetBorger Kommunefakta, delivered from KMD aka Kommunedata (Municipal Data)
 Municipal mergers and neighbors: Eniro  new municipalities map

External links 
 Hedensted municipality's official website 
 Vejle municipality's official website 

Former municipalities of Denmark